Excavation may refer to:

 Excavation (archaeology)
 Excavation (medicine)
 Excavation (The Haxan Cloak album), 2013
 Excavation (Ben Monder album), 2000
 Excavation (novel), a 2000 novel by James Rollins
 Excavation: A Memoir, a 2014 memoir by Wendy C. Ortiz
 Excavation (video game), a 2003 video game by WildTangent

See also
Excavate (disambiguation)
Excavator (disambiguation)
Excavata, a taxonomic grouping of eukaryotic unicellular organisms
Celaenia excavata, a spider